The Deuteronomist, abbreviated as either Dtr or simply D, may refer either to the source document underlying the core chapters (12–26) of the Book of Deuteronomy, or to the broader "school" that produced all of Deuteronomy as well as the Deuteronomistic history of Joshua, Judges, Samuel, Kings, and also the Book of Jeremiah. The adjectives "Deuteronomic" and "Deuteronomistic" are sometimes used interchangeably; if they are distinguished, then the first refers to the core of Deuteronomy and the second to all of Deuteronomy and the history.

The Deuteronomist is one of the sources identified through source criticism as underlying much of the Hebrew Bible. Among source-critical scholars, it is generally agreed that Deuteronomy and the Deuteronomistic history originated independently of the books of Genesis, Exodus, Leviticus and Numbers (the first four books of the Torah, sometimes called the "Tetrateuch", whose sources are the Priestly source and the Jahwist), and the history of the Books of Chronicles; most scholars trace all or most of it to the Babylonian exile (6th century BCE), and associate it with editorial reworking of both the Tetrateuch and Jeremiah.

Background
Since the mid-20th century, scholars have imagined the Deuteronomists as country Levites (a junior order of priests), or as prophets in the tradition of the northern Kingdom of Israel, or as sages and scribes at the royal court. Recent scholarship has interpreted the book as involving all these groups, and the origin and growth of Deuteronomism is usually described in the following terms:
 Following the destruction of Israel (the northern kingdom) by Assyria in 722 BCE, refugees came south to Judah, bringing with them traditions, notably the concept of Yahweh as the only God who should be served, which had not previously been known. Among those influenced by these new ideas were the landowning aristocrats (called "people of the land" in the Bible) who provided the administrative elite in Jerusalem.
 In 640 BCE there was a crisis in Judah when king Amon was murdered. The aristocrats suppressed the attempted coup, putting the ringleaders to death and placing Amon's eight-year-old son, Josiah, on the throne.
 Judah at this time was a vassal of Assyria, but Assyria now began a rapid and unexpected decline in power, leading to a resurgence of nationalism in Jerusalem. In 622 BCE Josiah launched his reform program, based on an early form of Deuteronomy 5–26, framed as a covenant (treaty) between Judah and Yahweh in which Yahweh replaced the Assyrian king.
 By the end of the 7th century BCE Assyria had been replaced by a new imperial power, Babylon. The trauma of the destruction of Jerusalem by the Babylonians in 586 BCE, and the exile which followed, led to much theological reflection on the meaning of the tragedy, and the Deuteronomistic history was written as an explanation: Israel had been unfaithful to Yahweh, and the exile was God's punishment.
 By about 540 BCE Babylon was also in rapid decline as the next rising power, the Achaemenid Empire, steadily ate away at it. With the end of the Babylonian oppression becoming ever more probable, Deuteronomy was given a new introduction and attached to the history books as an overall theological introduction.
 The final stage was the addition of a few extra laws following the Fall of Babylon to the Persians in 539 BCE and the return of some (in practice only a small fraction) of the exiles to Jerusalem.

Deuteronomistic works

Deuteronomy

Deuteronomy was formed by a complex process that reached probably from the 7th century BCE to the early 5th. It consists of a historical prologue; an introduction; the Deuteronomic Code followed by blessings and curses; and a conclusion.

The law code (chapters 12–26) forms the core of the book. 2 Kings 22–23 tells how a "Book of the Law", commonly identified with the code, was found in the Temple during the reign of Josiah. According to the story in Kings, the reading of the book caused Josiah to embark on a series of religious reforms, and it has been suggested that it was written in order to validate this program. Notwithstanding, it is generally accepted that at least some of the laws are much earlier than Josiah.

The introduction to the code (chapters 4:44–11:32) was added during Josiah's time, thus creating the earliest version of Deuteronomy as a book, and the historical prologue (chapters 1–4:43) was added still later to turn Deuteronomy into an introduction to the entire Deuteronomistic history (Deuteronomy to Kings).

Deuteronomistic history

The term was coined in 1943 by the German biblical scholar Martin Noth to explain the origin and purpose of Joshua, Judges, Samuel and Kings. These, he argued, were the work of a single 6th-century BCE author/compiler seeking to explain recent events (the fall of Jerusalem and the Babylonian exile) using the theology and language of the Book of Deuteronomy. The author used his sources with a heavy hand, depicting Joshua as a grand, divinely guided conquest, Judges as a cycle of rebellion and salvation, and the story of the kings as recurring disaster due to disobedience to God.

The late 1960s saw the beginning of a series of studies that modified Noth's original concept. In 1968 Frank Moore Cross made an important revision, suggesting that the history was in fact first written in the late 7th century BCE as a contribution to king Josiah's program of reform (the Dtr1 version), and only later revised and updated by Noth's 6th-century author (Dtr2). Dtr1 saw Israel's history as a contrast between God's judgment on the sinful northern kingdom of Jeroboam I (who set up golden calves to be worshiped in Bethel and Dan) and virtuous Judah, where faithful king David had reigned and where now the righteous Josiah was reforming the kingdom. The exilic Dtr2 supplemented Dtr1's history with warnings of a broken covenant, an inevitable punishment and exile for sinful (in Dtr2's view) Judah.

Cross's "dual redaction" model is probably the most widely accepted, but a considerable number of European scholars prefer an alternative model put forward by Rudolf Smend and his pupils. This approach holds that Noth was right to locate the composition of the history in the 6th century, but that further redactions took place after the initial composition, including a "nomistic" (from the Greek word for "law"), or DtrN, layer, and a further layer concerned with the prophets, abbreviated as DtrP.

For a time, the existence of the Deuteronomistic history enjoyed "canonical" status in biblical studies. However, writing in 2000, Gary N. Knoppers noted that "in the last five years an increasing number of commentators have expressed grave doubts about fundamental tenets of Noth's classic study."

Jeremiah and the prophetic literature
The prose sermons in the Book of Jeremiah are written in a style and outlook closely akin to, yet different from, the Deuteronomistic history. Scholars differ over how much of the book is from Jeremiah himself and how much from later disciples, but the Swiss scholar Thomas Römer has recently identified two Deuteronomistic "redactions" (editings) of the Book of Jeremiah occurring some time before the end of the Exile (pre-539 BCE) – a process which also involved the prophetic books of Amos and Hosea. In reference to the "authors" of the Deuteronomistic works, the biblical text records that Jeremiah the prophet used scribes such as Baruch to accomplish his ends. It is also noteworthy that the Deuteronomistic History never mentions Jeremiah, and some scholars believe that the "Jeremiah" Deuteronomists represent a distinct party from the "DtrH" Deuteronomists, with opposing agendas.

Deuteronomism (Deuteronomistic theology)
Deuteronomy is conceived of as a covenant (a treaty) between the Israelites and Yahweh, who has chosen ("elected") the Israelites as his people, and requires Israel to live according to his law. Israel is to be a theocracy with Yahweh as the divine suzerain. The law is to be supreme over all other sources of authority, including kings and royal officials, and the prophets are the guardians of the law: prophecy is instruction in the law as given through Moses, the law given through Moses is the complete and sufficient revelation of the Will of God, and nothing further is needed.

Under the covenant Yahweh has promised Israel the land of Canaan, but the promise is conditional: if the Israelites are unfaithful, they will lose the land. The Deuteronomistic history explains Israel's successes and failures as the result of faithfulness, which brings success, or disobedience, which brings failure; the destruction of the Kingdom of Israel by the Assyrians (721 BCE) and the Kingdom of Judah by the Babylonians (586) are Yahweh's punishment for continued sinfulness.

Deuteronomy insists on the centralisation of worship "in the place that the Lord your God will choose"; Deuteronomy never says where this place will be, but Kings makes it clear that it is Jerusalem.

It also shows a special concern for the poor, for widows and the fatherless: all Israelites are brothers and sisters, and each will answer to God for his treatment of his neighbor. This concern for equality and humanity extends also to the stranger who lives among the Israelites. The stranger is often mentioned in tandem with the concern for the widow and the orphan. Furthermore, there is a specific commandment to love the stranger.

See also
 Holiness code
 Gerhard von Rad

References

Bibliography

Commentaries

General
 
 
 
 
 Ausloos, Hans, The Deuteronomist’s History. The Role of the Deuteronomist in Historical-Critical Research into Genesis–Numbers (Old Testament Studies, 67), Leiden – Boston: Brill, 2015 
 
 
 
 
 
 
 
 
 
Gottwald, Norman, review of Stephen L. Cook, The Social Roots of Biblical Yahwism, Society of Biblical Literature, 2004

External links
 The Deuteronomist source (Dtr1) isolated, at wikiversity
 The Deuteronomist source (Dtr2) isolated, at wikiversity
 The narrative of Deuteronomy in isolation, at wikiversity

Documentary hypothesis
1940s neologisms